The Higher Education Services Institutes (LLDIKTI) is a system of institutions formed by the Indonesian government to provide guidance to the universities in its area of responsibility, either the university is private or public university, inside the jurisdiction of Indonesia. For the most of its existence, the system was placed under the Ministry of Education and Culture, before transferred to Ministry of Research, Technology, and Higher Education during Joko Widodo's first cabinet. It was briefly returned to the Ministry of Education and Culture, before transferred again to the Ministry of Education, Culture, Research and Technology after second reshuffle of his second cabinet.

History 
In 1967, the Indonesian government at that time initiated the formation a cooperation between the universities in Indonesia. The cooperation later named as Coordination of Higher Education Colleges (Indonesian: Koordinasi Pendidikan Tinggi, KOPERTI). On 17 February 1968, the KOPERTI later inaugurated by the Ministry of Education and Culture thru Ministry of Education and Culture Decree No. 1/PK/1968. When established, the KOPERTI had consultative relationship with local representative office of the Ministry in its responsible regions. When it formed initially, KOPERTI had 7 branches (East Java, Bali, West Nusa Tenggara, East Nusa Tenggara, South Kalimantan, Central Kalimantan, and East Kalimantan). However, with the boost of boom of formation of private universities in Indonesia, on 17 April 1975, thru Ministry of Education and Culture Decree No. 079/O/1975, the public universities later pulled to directly under the Ministry, no longer in KOPERTI, and KOPERTI scope later limited to accommodate only private universities. Since only accommodated private universities, KOPERTI later renamed as KOPERTIS (Indonesian: Koordinasi Pendidikan Tinggi Swasta, English: Coordination of Private Higher Education Colleges). Since then, the Ministry carried out the cooperation, and fostering the human resources of private universities through the KOPERTIS. When the number of private universities later peaked during 1980s - 1990s across Indonesia, the KOPERTIS later expanded from 7 branches to 12 branches thru Ministry of Education and Culture Decree No. 062/O/1982 and No. 0135/O/1990. Later thru Education and Culture Decree No. 1/2013, it expanded to 13 branches, and later to 14 branches thru Education and Culture Decree No. 42/2013. 

When Joko Widodo take his first presidency, he moved the Higher Education affairs to Ministry of Research and Technology, resulting in Ministry of Research, Technology, and Higher Education. As the consequence, KOPERTIS also moved to Ministry of Research, Technology, and Higher Education. Mohamad Nasir, Minister of Research, Technology, and Higher Education later ended the "discriminatory practices" between the private universities and public universities, promising equalities in guidance from the Ministry and better collaboration between the private universities and public universities. During his time, KOPERTIS transformed into LLDIKTI thru Ministry of Research, Technology, and Higher Education Decree No. 15/2018 on 9 April 2018. Since that, LLDIKTI become coordination between the private universities and public universities one more.

LLDIKTI later returned to Ministry of Education and Culture after Joko Widodo took his second presidency. In his second presidency, he returned Higher Education affairs to Ministry of Education and Culture. During Nadiem Makarim period as minister, LLDIKTI expanded into 16 branches thru Ministry of Education and Culture Decree No. 34/2020 on 21 July 2020. Later, LLDIKTI moved to Ministry of Education, Culture, Research, and Technology thru Ministry of Education, Culture, Research, and Technology Decree No. 28/2021 on 23 August 2021.

Responsibilities 
LLDIKTI responsibilities are:

 Higher education quality mapping;
 Facilitating for the improvement of the quality maintenance of the higher education institutions;
 Facilitating for the improvement the quality of higher education institutional management;
 Facilitating for the readiness for the higher education institutions to external quality assurance;
 Management of data and information of higher education institutions;
 Evaluation and reporting the improvement of higher education quality; and
 Administration affairs.

Structure 
All LLDIKTI branch offices are equal and responsible with the responsibilities regarding the maintenance of higher education standards and fostering the human resources quality and cooperation between the private universities and public universities in their respective areas and all are equally answered to the Ministry of the Education, Culture, Research, and Technology. For development of organizational affairs and human resources of LLDIKTIs, the LLDIKTIs received technical guidance from the General Directorate of Higher Education (now General Directorate of Research, Technology, and Higher Education) and the General Directorate of Vocational Education of the Ministry of the Education, Culture, Research, and Technology, and administrative guidance from the General Secretariat of the Ministry of the Education, Culture, Research, and Technology.

All LLDIKTI institutions, regardless their area of responsibility, each has same organization structure:

 Office of the LLDIKTI Director (answered to the Minister directly)
 Expert Staffs
 Office of the LLDIKTI Secretariat
 Administration Division
 Functionaries

Branches 
LLDIKTI possessed 16 branches across Indonesia.

 Higher Education Service Institute Branch I (North Sumatera Region)
 Higher Education Service Institute Branch II (South Sumatera, Lampung, Bengkulu, and Bangka Belitung Regions)
 Higher Education Service Institute Branch III (Jakarta Region)
 Higher Education Service Institute Branch IV (West Java and Banten Regions)
 Higher Education Service Institute Branch V (Yogyakarta Region)
 Higher Education Service Institute Branch VI (Central Java Regions)
 Higher Education Service Institute Branch VII (East Java Region)
 Higher Education Service Institute Branch VIII (Bali and West Nusa Tenggara Regions)
 Higher Education Service Institute Branch IX (South Sulawesi, South East Sulawesi, and West Sulawesi Regions)
 Higher Education Service Institute Branch X (West Sumatera, Riau, Jambi, and Riau Islands Regions)
 Higher Education Service Institute Branch XI (South Kalimantan, West Kalimantan, East Kalimantan, Central Kalimantan, and North Kalimantan Regions)
 Higher Education Service Institute Branch XII (Maluku and North Maluku Regions)
 Higher Education Service Institute Branch XIII (Aceh Region)
 Higher Education Service Institute Branch XIV (Papua and West Papua Regions)
 Higher Education Service Institute Branch XV (East Nusa Tenggara Region)
 Higher Education Service Institute Branch XVI (Central Sulawesi, North Sulawesi, and Gorontalo Regions)

Parent Organization 
LLDIKTI, as apparatus of the ministry, had been moved from many ministries in its existence.

 Ministry of Education and Culture (1968 - 2015)
 Ministry of Research, Technology, and Higher Education (2015 - 2019)
 Ministry of Education and Culture (2019 - 2021)
 Ministry of Education, Culture, Research and Technology (2021 - current)

References 

2018 establishments in Indonesia
Education in Indonesia
Higher education in Indonesia